Brutalism is the fifth studio album by New York City indie rock band, The Drums. The album was released on April 5, 2019, through ANTI-.

The album was preceded by the lead single, "Body Chemistry".

Track listing

Personnel 
 Produced by Jonathan Pierce, Bryan De Leon, and Sonny DiPerri
 Engineered by Sonny DiPerri
 Mixed by Chis Coady at Sunset Sound
 Mix Asst by Matthew Neighbor
 Mastered by Michelle Mancini, Demifugue at Larrabee Sound Studios
 Management: Andrew Mishko

References 

2019 albums
The Drums albums
Anti- (record label) albums